Iroquois Township is one of ten townships in Newton County, Indiana, United States. As of the 2010 census, its population was 1,358 and it contained 553 housing units.

History
The George Ade House was listed on the National Register of Historic Places in 1976.

Geography

Cities, towns, villages
 Brook

Unincorporated towns
 Foresman at 
(This list is based on USGS data and may include former settlements.)

Lakes
 Riverside Lake

Education
 South Newton School Corporation

Iroquois Township is served by the Brook-Iroquois Township Public Library.

Political districts
 Indiana's 1st congressional district
 State House District 15
 State Senate District 6

References
 
 United States Census Bureau 2008 TIGER/Line Shapefiles
 IndianaMap

External links
 Indiana Township Association
 United Township Association of Indiana
 City-Data.com page for Iroquois Township

Townships in Newton County, Indiana
Townships in Indiana